Sepon may refer to:

 Sepon, Assam, a town in India
 Xépôn, also known as Sepon, a village in Laos